Cafritz is a surname. Notable people with the surname include:

 Julia Cafritz (born 1965), American musician 
 Morris Cafritz (1888–1964), American real estate developer and philanthropist
 Peggy Cooper Cafritz (1947–2018), American philanthropist, educator, and civil rights activist